Otothyris lophophanes is a species of armored catfish endemic to Brazil, where it is found in the coastal streams of Rio de Janeiro State.  This species grows to a length of  SL.

References
 

Otothyrinae
Fish of South America
Fish of Brazil
Endemic fauna of Brazil
Taxa named by Rosa Smith Eigenmann
Taxa named by Carl H. Eigenmann
Fish described in 1889